Pierre François Xavier de Ram (September 2, 1804, Leuven – May 14, 1865, Leuven), was a Belgian papal prelate, canon and historian, best known for being the first rector of the new Catholic University of Belgium, founded in Mechelen in 1834, which in 1835 moved to Leuven as the Catholic University of Leuven.

Biography
De Ram entered the seminary at Mechelen, where he was ordained in 1827. He was appointed professor of poetry at the seminary of Mechelen and archivist of the diocese.

During the period when King William I was carrying on his campaign against the Catholic faith and traditions of the Belgians, and while de Ram was still young, he took an active part in the struggle maintained by the Belgian clergy against the government of the Netherlands, republishing eighteenth century works, in which, in a series of historical studies refuting the doctrines of Joseph II, he combatted the latter's disciple, King William I.

He was next appointed keeper of the diocesan records and professor in the episcopal seminary at Mechelen. In order to stay the spread of Protestantism in the Netherlands he collaborated with a movement for the publishing of religious works, bringing out  (Lives of the most prominent saints and celebrities of the Netherlands). His chief study for many years was hagiography, and he published an edition of Butler's Lives of the Saints (Leuven, 1828–35). Between 1828 and 1858 appeared the Synodicon Belgicum, a collection of unpublished documents upon the ecclesiastical history of the Netherlands since Philip II (Leuven, 4 vols., in quarto).

During the years immediately before the Revolution of 1830, de Ram, who was much influenced by Lamennais, was active in bringing about a coalition of Liberals and Catholics against the Dutch government established by the Powers  on the fall of Napoleon, and in endeavoring to give a democratic character to the policy of his church. He declined to stand as a member of the Belgian assembly, and applied himself wholly to teaching and to editing or composing historical books.

De Ram was an active member of the Royal Academies for Science and the Arts of Belgium and a foreign associate of the Bavarian Academy of Sciences and Humanities. When the monumental project of the Acta Sanctorum, interrupted in 1794, was resumed by the so-called New Bollandists in 1838, De Ram, who as a young man had bought the whole corpus – to this time 53 volumes in folio – and who himself was considered as a possible member of the board of editors, gave his expert opinion to the Commission royale d’histoire of the Royal Academy recommending warmly the prosecution of the much discussed project. As professor of philosophy at Mechelen he succeeded in bringing about the foundation of the Catholic University of Mechlin in 1834. This new university stayed only briefly in Mechelen, as the bishops already moved the university headquarters to Leuven on 1 December 1835, where it took the name Catholic University of Leuven, after the suppression of the State University of Leuven, where many professors from the old university had taught. This led to further consternation among the Belgian liberal society, which was afraid to see this new (conservative) university usurp the past of the former Old University of Leuven. It also reinvigorated demands for the foundation of a secular university in Brussels which would lead to the foundation of the Free University of Brussels.

De Ram was rector of the new Catholic University of Louvain founded in Mechlin in 1834 till his death in 1865.

Honours 
 Protonotarius Apostolicus
 Knight of the Order of Leopold 14 December 1838, Officier on 9 August 1855
 Officier of the Order of the Oak Crown.
 Encomienda of the Order of Isabella the Catholic, 9 June 1851
 Knight of the Order of Saint Hubert, Bavaria, 3 May 1895
 Knight of the Order of the Red Eagle, 2 August 1853
 Commandor of the Supreme Order of Christ, 5 August 1854
 Knight of the Saxe-Ernestine House Order, 12 August 1854
 member of the Royal Academie, 15 December 1837

References

External link

1804 births
1865 deaths
Writers from Leuven
Clergy from Leuven
19th-century Belgian historians
19th-century Belgian male writers
Belgian historians of religion
19th-century Belgian Roman Catholic priests
Academic staff of the Catholic University of Leuven (1834–1968)